George Massy (1706 - 1782) was Archdeacon of Ardfert from 1772 until his death.

He was educated at Trinity College, Dublin. His uncle was Dean of Limerick from 1740 to 1766.

References

Irish Anglicans
Archdeacons of Ardfert
1782 deaths
1706 births